Vince Bellissimo (born December 14, 1982) is a Canadian former professional ice hockey player. Bellissimo was selected by the Florida Panthers in the 5th round (158th overall) of the 2002 NHL Entry Draft.

Playing career
Bellissimo, brother of Daniel Bellissimo, played NCAA college hockey with the Western Michigan Broncos men's ice hockey team before beginning his professional career in the American Hockey League with the San Antonio Rampage near the end of the 2004–05 AHL season.

In 2007, after three seasons of playing in the North American minor leagues, Bellissimo arrived in Europe to play in the Deutsche Eishockey Liga (DEL) with the ERC Ingolstadt. In 2009, after two brief experiences in SM-liiga, Finland, and Austria, he returned to Ingolstadt.

During the 2009-10 season, Bellissimo arrived at HC Asiago where his brother Daniel was playing already. After winning the title with Asiago, for family reasons he decided to return to North America to play his final 2010–11 season in the ECHL with the Las Vegas Wranglers.

Career statistics

Awards and honours

References

External links

1982 births
Living people
Asiago Hockey 1935 players
Canadian ice hockey right wingers
ERC Ingolstadt players
Florida Everblades players
Florida Panthers draft picks
HC TWK Innsbruck players
KalPa players
Las Vegas Wranglers players
Lowell Lock Monsters players
San Antonio Rampage players
Ice hockey people from Toronto
Topeka Scarecrows players
Western Michigan Broncos men's ice hockey players
Canadian expatriate ice hockey players in Austria
Canadian expatriate ice hockey players in Italy
Canadian expatriate ice hockey players in Finland
Canadian expatriate ice hockey players in Germany